Cultural Survival (founded 1972) is a nonprofit group based in Cambridge, Massachusetts, United States, which is dedicated to defending the human rights of indigenous peoples.

History

Cultural Survival was founded by anthropologist David Maybury-Lewis and his wife, Pia, in response to the opening up of the Amazonian and South American hinterlands during the 1960s, and the drastic effects this had on Indigenous inhabitants. It has since worked with Indigenous communities in Asia, Africa, South America, North America, and Australia, becoming the leading US-based organization defending the rights of Indigenous Peoples around the world. Headquartered in Cambridge, Massachusetts, Cultural Survival also has a satellite office for the Guatemala Radio Project in Guatemala.

As of 2022, Cultural Survival had a four-star rating from Charity Navigator.

PONSACS

The Program on Nonviolent Sanctions in Conflict (PNS), a research division of Harvard's Center for International Affairs, was created by Gene Sharp in 1983. Its focus was the use of nonviolent sanctions as a substitute for violent interventions. Sharp also founded the independent non-profit Albert Einstein Institution (AEI) a few months later, which became the funding body for the Program.

In 1995 (some years after Sharp's departure) PNS merged with Cultural Survival, creating the Program on Nonviolent Sanctions and Cultural Survival (PONSACS). PONSACS focussed on "nonviolent alternatives for the preservation of all peoples and their cultures", flourishing for ten years before eventually closing in 2005.

See also
Friends of Peoples Close to Nature
Survival International

References

External links

Organizations based in Cambridge, Massachusetts
Native American organizations
Anthropology organizations
Ethnology
Charities based in Massachusetts
Organizations established in 1972
Non-profit organizations based in Massachusetts
1972 establishments in Massachusetts